Milo is a sub-location in Sitikho Location of Bungoma County, Kenya. It is headed by Emmanuel Murokoyo. It is located approximately 34 degrees East of the Greenwich Meridian and 30 minutes North of the equator. It is bordered by the Nzoia River and River Muji. The area is heavily populated and it is mainly used for agriculture: Maize, millet, sorghum, beans, bananas and sugarcane are some of the crops produced in this area. Other economic activities include fishing, animal rearing and bodaboda.

Education
Academically, Milo boasts of having good schools. For example, in 2010, Milo Central Academy was ranked third in Western province and tenth in the whole country with a meanscore of 387.59 out of 500. It emulated Milo secondary school, which was 45th in the whole republic three years earlier.

References 

Bungoma County
Populated places in Western Province (Kenya)